Buciara bipartita is a moth of the family Noctuidae. It is found in the Australian Capital Territory, New South Wales, South Australia and Victoria.

The larvae have been reared on Hibbertia exutiacies, Hibbertia sericea and Hibbertia stricta.

External links
Australian Faunal Directory

Moths of Australia
Noctuinae
Moths described in 1869